Marquess of Cañada Honda is a noble title in the peerage of Spain, bestoweded on Emilio Drake, by the Queen Regent Maria Christina of Austria on 20 March 1893. The title refers to the volcanic area of Cañada Honda, in the province of Almería. Emilio Drake was son of the 1st Count of Vega Mar and the 7th Marchioness of Eguaras.

Marquesses of Cañada Honda (1893)

Emilio Drake y de la Cerda, 1st Marquess of Cañada Honda (1855-1915)
Francisco de Paula Drake y Fernández-Durán, 2nd Marquess of Cañada Honda (1880-1936), son of the 1st Marquess
María de la Asunción Drake y Santiago, 3rd Marchioness of Cañada Honda (1906-1977), daughter of the 2nd Marquess
Francisco de Paula Alfaro y Drake, 4th Marquess of Cañada Honda (b. 1940), son of the 3rd Marchioness

See also
House of la Cerda

References

Bibliography
 

Lists of Spanish nobility